Jean-Jacques Mounier (born 12 June 1949) is a French former judoka who competed in the 1972 Summer Olympics.

References

External links
 

1949 births
Living people
French male judoka
Olympic judoka of France
Judoka at the 1972 Summer Olympics
Olympic bronze medalists for France
Olympic medalists in judo
Medalists at the 1972 Summer Olympics
Sportspeople from Lisbon
20th-century French people